Brigadoon is a 1947 musical by Alan Jay Lerner and Frederick Loewe, and its fictional setting.

Brigadoon may also refer to:

Arts
 Brigadoon (film), a 1954 American film based on the musical, directed by Vincente Minnelli
 Brigadoon (1966 film), an American television film based on the musical
 Brigadoon (album), by the Ancestors, 1994
 Brigadoon: Marin & Melan, a 2000–2001 Japanese anime series

Places
 Brigadoon, Western Australia, a suburb of Perth, Australia
 Brigadoon Children's Camp, a non-profit recreational facility on Aylesford Lake, Nova Scotia, Canada
 Brigadoon Lodge, a trout-fishing lodge on the Soque River in Georgia, US
 Brigadoon, Lexington, a neighborhood in Lexington, Kentucky, US
 Brigadoon State Nature Preserve, Barren County, Kentucky, US

See also
 Brig o' Doon, a Scottish landmark
 "Germelshausen", an 1860 story by Friedrich Gerstäcker that some believe inspired the 1947 play
 Brigadoon Highland Gathering, an annual festival in Bundanoon, New South Wales, Australia